The Bhagwan Mahaveer Cancer Hospital and Research Centre (BMCHRC) is located in Jawahar Lal Nehru Marg, Bajaj Nagar, Jaipur, Rajasthan. It is also popularly known as BMCHRC. It is a super-speciality cancer treatment, education, and research centre, closely associated with the National Accreditation Board for Hospitals & Healthcare Providers (NABH) accredited institution following international protocol cancer treatment, managed by K G Kothari Memorial Trust.

History 
In 1992, the initiative of establishing a cancer hospital in Rajasthan was put forward in August. The meeting was held in the presence of Late Bhairon Singh Shekhawat, the then Chief Minister of Rajasthan & Late Vidya Vinod Kala. The approval on the proposal to establish the centre was given, and the state government allotted 22166 sq. yd. of land for construction.

The Bhagwan Mahaveer Cancer Hospital and Research Centre was commissioned in 1996 by Navrattan Kothari and became operational in 1997 as a centre with values and concern for every patient. Started as a 50-bed hospital, it now has 300 beds, and an IPD block is under construction.

Milestones
1997: Establishment of the hospital under the aegis of BMCHRC Trust.
1998: Establishment of women's wing of cancer care.
2010: Establishment of Dreamz foundation for treating cancer-affected patients.
1999-2014: Inauguration of a Palliative Care Ward, Facility of Radioiodine Therapy, and Positron emission tomography (PET) diagnostic machine.
2015: NABH Accreditation was awarded. An organ-based treatment facility was introduced.
2017: Establishment of AML (Acute Myeloid Leukemia) Ward, Hospice Ward, Started Laser Surgery & Introduce Gallium - 68 generator.
2019: Establishment of the Neuro Ortho OT (Operating theater) and Linear Accelerator (Varian Truebeam Stx / Halcyon LA) & New Brach Therapy Machine got installed.
2020: Advanced PET CT and gamma camera installed.
2021: MRI Machines got installed. Launching of Arogya Dham. Inauguration of Geriatric Oncology. Stone laying of cancer care Bhawan.
2022: Establishment of Bone Marrow Transplant (BMT) unit.

Patient Care at BMCHRC
BMCHRC provides comprehensive cancer care to patients. The specialities include
 Surgical Oncology
 Neuro Onco Surgery
 Ortho Oncology
 Plastic & Reconstructive Surgery
 Medical Oncology
 Radiation Oncology
 Haematology-oncology
 Gynecologic Oncology
 Anesthesiology

In addition to the above treatment, the hospital provides numerous clinical services to the patients, including palliative care, psycho-oncology, ostomy clinic, dietary services, physiotherapy, dental care, and preventive oncology.
Diagnostic 
BMCHRC provides diagnostic care to the patients through various diagnostic procedures including:
Nuclear Medicine 
Radiology
MRI
Pathology
Transfusion services
Microbiology

Major Achievements 
 Since 2021, the Bhagwan Mahaveer Cancer Hospital has worked on several programmes. Over 189 children under 14 who were suffering from any of the three forms of curable blood malignancies — acute lymphoblastic leukaemia, acute promyelocytic leukaemia, or Hodgkin lymphoma - benefited from a one-of-a-kind fund.
 During the financial year 2020–2021, the hospital spent 7.28 crore for free treatment for people under the Below Poverty Line (BPL).
 In 2022, BMCHRC provided free blood cancer treatment to 199 children under its flagship welfare programme.
 In 2017, the BMCHRC team successfully performed a unique organ reconstruction surgery to remove oral cancer in a 42-year-old patient.

Awards and recognition 
The institute has won awards in different categories by different organisations, bodies, and institutions over the years.
 2016: Best Healthcare Trust Provider Award

R&D and Technology 
The BMCHRC uses state-of-the-art technology and medical equipment, including various diagnostic, treatment, aftercare, and research facilities available at the hospital.

Diagnosis forms a significant part of the hospital's outpatient department, with the hospital providing Radio Diagnosis, Pathology, Nuclear Medicine and blood transfusion and microbiology. Services provided by BMCHRC in diagnosis include Two Linear Accelerators with Rapid Arc, IGRT, IMRT and 3D CRT, SRS, SRT technology, PET CT 16 SLICE, and Radio Iodine Therapy.

In addition to these, the hospital has 6 integrated modular operation theatres, complete with all the latest modalities in cancer surgery like Laser Cancer Surgery and Micro Laryngeal Surgery. In addition to these, the hospital also has a special 14 bedded Surgical ICU, a 60 bedded daycare ward for chemotherapy patients, and a dedicated Pain And Palliative Care Department.

BMCHRC is also well known for providing assistance and clinical trial grounds to researchers from around the globe. A testimony to this is the treatment of bone cancer using the hot dog technique, which is considered to be a boon for treating bone cancer in patients.

The hospital conducted cancer surgeries on the leg using the hot dog technique. Using this technique, the cancerous bone is removed and made cancer-free by using radiotherapy and nitrogen in liquid form, after which it is again taken to the original place.

Oncology efforts
BMCHRC has been involved in identifying and treating cancer in the state of Rajasthan and has implemented several initiatives in the rural and far reaches of the state.

Associated facilities and programme 
Since 1999, the hospital has organised preventive oncology camps in rural Rajasthan. They have organised close to 1200 camps in 20+ years, with almost 200,000 benefactors of the programme. These camps have also begun to cover villages and sub-urban areas of nearby states.

The organisation has teams of General physicians, oncologists, gynecologists, ENT specialists, radiographers, Paramedical & Nursing staff. In addition to this, BMCHRC has a special Cancer Screening Mobile Van and Women Health Van. These vans are equipped with Mammography, X-ray machines, dark room, laboratory & procedure room, all used for cancer screening and early detection.

Welfare initiatives 
In addition to the camps, BMCHRC has been running several different welfare initiatives to provide cancer treatment to underprivileged children, women, and families since its inception. This includes donation programs, special kids cancer units, no-cost medical and treatment services for children, and special programmes to cure thyroid cancer and stop the recurrence of breast cancer in women.

Financial and Other Assistance 
The Power Finance Corporation (PFC) has given BMCHRC a loan of Rs 136 lakh to acquire a surgical operating microscope.

Services for international patients 
BMCHRC provides services to international patients, including visa assistance, logistics of the stay, hospital arrangements, airport shuttle, and post-treatment tours.

School of nursing and other training 
In the year 2005, BMCHRC started the BMCHRC College of Nursing, where more than 1000 students have received formal nursing education so far. It also provides palliative care training to improve the standards of medical care in the country.

References

Hospitals in Rajasthan
Hospitals established in 1997
Oncology
Jaipur
1997 establishments in Rajasthan